Chanatphol Sikkamonthol (born January 2, 1989) is a Thai professional footballer who currently plays for Phrae United in the Thai League 2.

References

External links
 

1989 births
Living people
Chanatphol Sikkamonthol
Chanatphol Sikkamonthol
Association football midfielders
Chanatphol Sikkamonthol
Chanatphol Sikkamonthol